Andrew Neu (June 20, 1873 – July 16, 1959) was an American gymnast. He competed in three events at the 1904 Summer Olympics.

References

External links
 

1873 births
1959 deaths
American male artistic gymnasts
Olympic gymnasts of the United States
Gymnasts at the 1904 Summer Olympics
Sportspeople from St. Louis